A Map of Jimmy Cleveland is an album led by American trombonist Jimmy Cleveland featuring tracks recorded in 1958. It was released on the Mercury label.

Reception

The Allmusic review stated: "Trombonist Jimmy Cleveland made a series of outstanding LPs for Emarcy and Mercury during the 1950s... this collectable LP is well worth tracking down".

Track listing
 "Swing Low, Sweet Chariot" (Traditional) - 5:15
 "A Hundred Years from Today" (Victor Young, Joe Young, Ned Washington) - 4:36
 "Marie" (Irving Berlin) - 4:45
 "Jay Bird" (J. J. Johnson) - 3:30
 "The Best Things in Life Are Free" (Ray Henderson, Buddy DeSylva, Lew Brown) - 4:28
 "Stardust" (Hoagy Carmichael, Mitchell Parish) - 4:51
 "Jimmy's Old Funky Blues" (Ernie Wilkins) - 8:43

Personnel 
Jimmy Cleveland - trombone
Ray Copeland - trumpet
Ernie Royal - flugelhorn
Don Butterfield - tuba
Jerome Richardson - tenor saxophone, flute
Junior Mance - piano
Bill Crow - bass
Art Taylor - drums
Ernie Wilkins - arranger

References 

1959 albums
Jimmy Cleveland albums
Mercury Records albums
Albums arranged by Ernie Wilkins
Albums produced by Hal Mooney